Jeremy James Palmer-Tomkinson (born 4 November 1943 in Wokingham, Berkshire) was a British Olympian who competed at the Winter Olympics in 1968, 1972, 1976 and 1980. His father James and brother Charles were also Olympians, while his nieces Santa Montefiore and Tara Palmer-Tomkinson are famous in their own right.

References

1943 births
Living people
British male alpine skiers
British male lugers
Olympic alpine skiers of Great Britain
Olympic lugers of Great Britain
People from Wokingham
Sportspeople from Berkshire
Alpine skiers at the 1968 Winter Olympics
Lugers at the 1972 Winter Olympics
Lugers at the 1976 Winter Olympics
Lugers at the 1980 Winter Olympics
Jeremy